Kuhbach is a river of Hesse, Germany. It passes through Korbach and flows into the Itter near Vöhl-Obernburg.

See also
List of rivers of Hesse

References

Rivers of Hesse
Rivers of Germany